George Mandy (13 July 1906 – 12 October 1986) was a South African cricketer. He played in nineteen first-class matches from 1926/27 to 1947/48.

References

External links
 

1906 births
1986 deaths
South African cricketers
Border cricketers
Eastern Province cricketers